Anishinabe of Wauzhushk Onigum is an Anishinaabe First Nation in northwestern Ontario. Its reserves include Kenora 38B and the shared reserve of Agency 30. It is a part of the Anishinabeg of Kabapikotawangag Resource Council, a party to the Grand Council of Treaty 3. Wauzhushk Onigum is govern by 1 Chief and 3 Council members. Current Chief is Chris Skead and council members are Dave Skead, Ed Skeid and Donald Biggeorge. Chief and council are elected by members of Wauzhushk Onigum.

References

Anishinaabe peoples
First Nations in Ontario